Davide Zugaro De Matteis, known as Davide Zugaro (born 16 April 2000) is an Italian footballer who plays as a full-back for  club Sangiuliano City, on loan from Inter Milan.

Club career

Internazionale 
He played most of his youth career with Pescara. In January 2018, his rights were purchased by Inter, who loaned him back to Pescara.

Loan to Olbia 
On 9 August 2019, Zugaro joined Serie C club Olbia on a season-long loan. Five months later, on 22 January 2020, he made his professional Serie C in a game against Siena. He substituted Mattia Pitzalis in the 74th minute. Four days later he made his second appearances, replacing Francesco Pisano in the 76th minute of a 3–3 away draw against Alessandria. On 30 June, Zugaro made his third appearances for the club, again as a substitute, replacing Antonio Candela in the 75th minute of a 1–1 away draw against Giana Erminio in the second leg of the play-out where Olbia wins 2–1 on aggregate to avoid relegation in Serie D. Zugaro ended his season-long loan to Olbia with only 3 appearances, all as a substitute, he remained an unused substitute for other 26 matches.

Loan to Giana Erminio 
On 23 September 2020, Zugaro moved to Serie C side Giana Erminio on a season-long loan. Two weeks later he made his debut for the club as a substiute replacing Vincent De Maria in the 46th minute of a 2–1 away defeat against Novara. One week later, on 12 October, he played his first entire match for Giana Erminio, a 1–0 away win over AlbinoLeffe. He became Giano Erminio's first-choice early in the season. On 25 November he was sent-off with a double yellow card in the 59th minute of a 2–0 home win over Piacenza. On 17 March 2021, Zugaro scored his first professional goal in the 42nd minute of a 4–3 home win over Lucchese. Zugaro ended his season-long loan to Giana Erminio with 30 appearances, including 21 of them as a starter.

Loan to Virtus Verona 
On 22 July 2021, Zugaro was loaned to Serie C club Virtus Verona on a season-long loan deal.

Career statistics

Club

References

External links
 

2000 births
Living people
Sportspeople from Pescara
Footballers from Abruzzo
Italian footballers
Association football defenders
Serie C players
Inter Milan players
Olbia Calcio 1905 players
A.S. Giana Erminio players
Virtus Verona players
F.C. Sangiuliano City players